Gaygan (also Romanized as Gāygān, Gāyekān, Kaygan, Kāykān, and Kāygān) is a village in Borborud-e Sharqi Rural District, in the Central District of Aligudarz County, Lorestan Province, Iran. At the 2006 census, its population was 836, in 177 families.

References 

Towns and villages in Aligudarz County